Q